Lydie Dubedat-Briero (born 15 February 1962) is a French rower. She competed at the 1984 Summer Olympics and the 1988 Summer Olympics. In 1989, she placed 6th in the World Rowing Championships held in Bled, Slovenia. In 1990, she placed 5th in Tasmania, Australia.

References

1962 births
Living people
French female rowers
Olympic rowers of France
Rowers at the 1984 Summer Olympics
Rowers at the 1988 Summer Olympics
Rowers from Paris
20th-century French women
21st-century French women